Tom Clancy's Ghost Recon is a video game franchise.

Tom Clancy's Ghost Recon may also refer to:

Tom Clancy's Ghost Recon (2001 video game), the first game in the series
Tom Clancy's Ghost Recon (2010 video game), a Wii exclusive video game
Tom Clancy's Ghost Recon (novel)